This is an incomplete list of ghost towns in Missouri.

 Amply
 Ark
 Arlington
 Bloodland
 Columbia / St. Vrain
 Cookville
 Defiance (Worth County)
 Doolittle
 Georgia City
 Hamburg
 Holman
 Hopewell (Daviess County)
 Hopewell (Mississippi County)
 Hopewell Furnace
 Howell
 Lakeside
 Lakeside Estate
 Lone Tree
 Melva
 Monark Springs
 Phenix
 Plew
 Possum Trot
 Rueter
 Saint Annie
 St. Andre’ Del Misuri 
 Spencer
 Times Beach
 Toonerville
 Wayman
 Wakenda
 Wila
 Xenia

Hamburg, Howell, and Toonerville were all located in St. Charles County.  All three towns became part of the Weldon Spring Ordnance Works in 1941 for WWII, which later became part of the Weldon Spring Site Remedial Action Project (WSSRAP))

Notes and references

 
Missouri
Ghost towns